The Florence Center is a 10,000-seat multipurpose arena in Florence, South Carolina. The arena was known as the Florence Civic Center until it rebranded in November 2017.

It hosted the infamous eighth WWF In Your House pay-per-view in 1996, during which a storm knocked out the power and thus the broadcast signal during the event. The card was re-telecast two nights later from North Charleston, South Carolina, at the North Charleston Coliseum. 

Since 2005 it is home to the annual Darlington Car Hauler Parade that kicks off Bojangles' Southern 500 race week at Darlington Raceway. In 2019, an indoor football team called the Carolina Havoc of the American Arena League, is announced to begin play at the Florence Center for the 2019 season.

The building was the home of the South Carolina Fire Ants of Major League Roller Hockey in 1998, two ice hockey teams: the Pee Dee/Florence Pride (1997–2005) and the Pee Dee Cyclones (2005–2007), two indoor football teams: Carolina Stingrays (2004) and Florence Phantoms (2006–2009), two basketball teams: the Florence Flyers and the Pee Dee Vipers, and to the Florence Symphony Orchestra.

The Florence Center has hosted: Sent by Ravens (from Hartsville) in '11, Lady A in '11, Willie Nelson in '13, Marshall Tucker Band with Charlie Daniels Band in '13, The Beach Boys in '13, Switchfoot with Needtobreathe in '15, Mary J. Blige in '15, and Boyz II Men in '19.

References

External links
 

1993 establishments in South Carolina
Basketball venues in South Carolina
Buildings and structures in Florence, South Carolina
Indoor arenas in South Carolina
Indoor ice hockey venues in the United States
Sports venues in Florence County, South Carolina
Sports venues completed in 1993